BFSP2 is a gene that encodes the protein phakinin ("beaded filament structural protein 2") in humans.

More than 99% of the vertebrate ocular lens consists of terminally differentiated lens fiber cells.  Two lens-specific intermediate filament proteins, the protein product of this gene (CP49 or phakinin) and filensin (also known as CP115), are expressed only after fiber cell differentiation has begun. Both proteins are found in a structurally unique cytoskeletal element that is referred to as the beaded filament (BF). Mutations in this gene have been associated with juvenile-onset, progressive cataracts and Dowling-Meara epidermolysis bullosa simplex.

The two BFSP proteins are put into a "type VI" of intermediate filament (IF) classification. Unlike other IFs that form unbranched links, the two proteins form a network of filaments together with CRYAA.

References

External links

Further reading